Servicio Mexicano de Vuelos de Fletamento S. A. de C. V., operating as Aeroméxico Travel, was a charter flight subsidiary of Aeroméxico, and started operations on June 2, 2008, with the inaugural flight AM6771 from Mexico City to Cancún. The airline was in charge of charter flights from Mexican resort destinations to several cities in the United States and Canada. In August 2011, its parent company, Aeroméxico, decided to retire the "Travel" brand and focus on scheduled operations instead.

Destinations
The airline operated flights to the United States, as well as charter flights from Mexico City and Monterrey to Cancún, Puerto Vallarta, Huatulco, Mérida, Mazatlán, and Cozumel. The airline had charter flights to Minneapolis from Cancún during the winter and early spring. Seasonal flights from Chicago-O'Hare to Mexico City, Monterrey, and Morelia were also flown in 2011.

Fleet
The Aeroméxico Travel fleet consisted of the following aircraft.

Aeroméxico Travel had an average fleet age of 22.9 years

External links

Aeroméxico

References

Aeroméxico
Defunct airlines of Mexico
Airlines established in 2008
Charter airlines of Mexico
Airlines disestablished in 2011